Michaelophorus is a genus of moths in the family Pterophoridae. Species in this genus are distributed in regions with neotropical climates. Little is known about the genus' overall ecology.

Species
 Michaelophorus nubilus (type)
 Michaelophorus dentiger
 Michaelophorus indentatus
 Michaelophorus margaritae
 Michaelophorus hodgesi
 Michaelophorus shafferi
 Michaelophorus bahiaensis

References

Platyptiliini
Moths described in 1999
Taxa named by Cees Gielis
Moth genera